Jeruzal may refer to the following places:
Jeruzal in Łódź Voivodeship (central Poland)
Jeruzal, Białobrzegi County in Masovian Voivodeship (east-central Poland)
Jeruzal, Mińsk County in Masovian Voivodeship (east-central Poland)